Charles Planet (born 30 October 1993) is a French professional racing cyclist, who currently rides for UCI ProTeam .

Major results
2018
 8th Overall Tour of Estonia
2019
 1st  Active rider classification Tour de Pologne
 7th Overall Tour of Estonia
2020 
 7th Circuito de Getxo

References

External links

1993 births
Living people
French male cyclists
People from Remiremont
Sportspeople from Vosges (department)
Cyclists from Grand Est
People with type 1 diabetes